Lingwu (Xiao'erjing: لِئٍ‌وُ شِ) is a county-level city of Ningxia Hui Autonomous Region, Southwest China, it is under the administration of the prefecture-level city of Yinchuan. It is the most important industrial city of Ningxia.

Toponymy 
Lingwu was historically known as Lingzhou (Xiao'erjing: لِئٍ‌جِوْ).

History
During the Warring States period, the area was absorbed into the Qin dynasty under Beidi Commandery. The area was first incorporated into the Han dynasty in 191 BCE by Emperor Hui. In 526 CE, Bogulu Town was renamed as Lingzhou. In 756 CE, during the Tang dynasty, Emperor Suzong fled to Lingzhou  during the Anshi Rebellion, where he ascended the throne with the aid of loyal bureaucrats and military supporters, only notifying his father Xuanzong after the fact. Lingzhou became part of the Western Xia in 1038. It was besieged by Genghis Khan in November 1226.

On May 20, 1996, Lingwu was upgraded from a county to a county-level city. On October 25, 2002, Lingwu was transferred from the prefecture-level city of Wuzhong to Yinchuan.

Geography 
The western border of Lingwu is formed by the Yellow River.

Climate 
Lingwu's climate is arid, with little precipitation and high levels of sunshine.

Administrative divisions
Lingwu administers one subdistrict, six towns, two townships, and one other township-level division.

Subdistricts 
The city's sole subdistrict is
 .

Towns 
The city's six towns are 
 (




Linhe.

Townships 
The city's two townships are

.

Other township-level divisions 
The city also administers the township-level division of
.

Demographics 
Lingwu's population was reported as 261,677 in the 2010 Chinese census. In the 2000 Chinese census, the city's population was 249,890. The city has a Hui majority population.

Economy
The city has significant coal, natural gas, and petroleum reserves. Lingwu has a proven coal reserve of 27.3 billion tons.

Lingwu also has a significant agricultural sector, with rice, wheat, corn, and jujubes all being grown in the city. The city is well known for its "Lingwu long jujube". This fruit has proven to be one of Ningxia's most popular agricultural products, producing an income of over 10 million yuan per year.

Notable sites 

 Zhenhe Pagoda
 
 Portions of the Ming Great Wall

See also
Empress Erzhu (Yuan Ye's wife)
Gao Huan
Lingwulong, named after Lingwu
Yuwen Tai

References

External links
Lingwu Government Website (2021) (Chinese)
Lingwu Government Website (2007) (Chinese)
Satellite map of Lingwu

 
Cities in Ningxia
County-level divisions of Ningxia
Yinchuan